Thomas Thorp (4 March 1797 – 24 February 1877) was Archdeacon of Bristol from 1836 until 1873.

Thorp was educated at King's School, Pontefract and Trinity College, Cambridge. He was ordained deacon and priest in 1829. He was Rector of Kemerton from 1839 to 1877.

References

1797 births
People educated at The King's School, Pontefract
Alumni of Trinity College, Cambridge
Archdeacons of Bristol
1877 deaths